Anastasia Golovina, also known as Anastassya Nikolau Berladsky-Golovina, and Atanasya Golovina (1850-1933) was the first Bulgarian female doctor.

Biography
She was born in Kishinev. She graduated from the Sorbonne in 1878 where she defended her doctoral thesis "Histological examination of the walls of the arteries", which provoked the admiration of the scientist Jean Charcot.  She was the first Bulgarian woman to graduate from a university.

She worked in hospitals and schools, and was a specialist in internal diseases as well as a psychiatrist. She had contacts with the progressive, revolutionary circles in Bulgaria and Russia in the middle of the 1870s.

Further reading
 Kalchev, K. (1996): “Dr Anastasia Golovina. Edna zabravena balgarka” [Dr. Anastasya Golovina. A Forgotten Bulgarian Woman]. Veliko Tarnovo.

References

1850 births
1933 deaths
19th-century Bulgarian physicians
20th-century Bulgarian physicians
20th-century women physicians
19th-century women physicians
Bulgarian women physicians